The Three Ages of the Interior Life: Prelude of Eternal Life (Les trois âges de la vie intérieure, prélude de celle du Ciel) is the magnum opus of Fr. Réginald Garrigou-Lagrange, a French theologian of the Order of Preachers (Dominican Order).  The two volume publication represents both the summary of teaching ascetical and mystical theology for twenty years at the Angelicum and the synthesis of two other works: Christian Perfection and Contemplation and L’amour de Dieu et la croix de Jesus. The work is framed according to three stages that mark the common path of Christian perfection, which are described in conformity to the preexisting theology and wisdom of Catholic saints and Church Fathers. His synthesis has become one of the most the dominant present-day interpretations of this patrimony.

Overview 
The namesake and structure of the work are based on the three stages of Christian perfection in charity. Numerous Catholic saints and Church Fathers have attempted to articulate the typical stages, ways, ages, or conversions of spiritual maturation, some of whom proposed a threefold division. Although he explicitly integrates a significant portion of these references, Garrigou-Lagrange prioritizes the terminology of Pseudo-Dionysius, Thomas Aquinas, and John of the Cross as the most representative of their accumulated insight.

Those who are spiritual children, beginning their Christian maturation, require a generous exercise of asceticism and virtue to remove the most serious obstacles to communion with God. This effort with sensible experiences of God's presence and favor. The person typically begins to associate sensible confirmations with God himself, which impedes the capacity to perceive and commune with God more profoundly. In response, God withdraws this sensible presence to dispose the person to spiritual realities and receive the grace for further prayer and union. Generosity begets a more proficient spiritual rapport with God with greater light from the Holy Spirit. Further advancement reveals subtle remains of pride and selfishness, which can only perfected by a path of humility directed by the Holy Spirit. Perseverance through this purification allows the person to be perfected in spiritual adulthood, which entails mystical union with God in love.

Garrigou-Lagrange is not the first to recapitulate the common insights of Catholic saints and Church Fathers. However, his model is preeminent in representing the importance and normalcy of infused contemplation, which culminates in a “quasi-experimental” knowledge of God through the gift of wisdom. In other words, the person knows God by recognizing the effects produced from the Trinity dwelling in the soul, particularly that of filial affection, and inferring him to be their cause. The importance of this infused contemplation is not diminished by the call to an active and apostolic lifestyle. On the contrary, infused contemplation is all the more necessary to preserve the integrity and fruitfulness of the mission.

Impact and Criticism
Some have challenged Garrigou-Lagrange’s Neo-Thomistic approach to concepts that are significant to The Three Ages of the Interior Life. Robert Barron, acknowledging the significant influence of Garrigou-Lagrange’s years at the Angelicum, generally associates him with a “strict rationalistic, somewhat ahistorical, very deductive, and somewhat defensive reading of Thomas Aquinas.”  The nature of and normalcy of infused contemplation has been debated since Garrigou-Lagrange’s time, and the question was raised if he understands the nuances behind Thomas Aquinas’ use of term “quasi-experimental knowledge.” 

The basic concepts of his interpretation continue to be referenced in the Catholic Church. This influenced the section entitled "Chapter V: The Universal Call to Holiness in the Church" in the Second Vatican Council's Dogmatic Constitution on the Church, Lumen gentium. Pope John Paul II, who was taught by Garrigou-Lagrange, alludes the three ages as the horizon for the spiritual life. Servais-Théodore Pinckaers, another student of Garrigou-Lagrange, also references the three stages in his Sources of Christian Ethics. At large, the model is also commonly used as a reference for providing spiritual direction.

References

Bibliography

See also
Réginald Garrigou-Lagrange
Catholic theology
Mystical theology
Christian perfection
Dark Night of the Soul

External links
 The Three Ages of the Spiritual life According to the Fathers and the Great Spiritual Writers

Religious studies books
1938 books
Catholic spirituality
Christian theology books
Catholic theology and doctrine
French-language works
20th-century French literature